Matthew Scott (1867 – 1897) was an English professional footballer who played as a goalkeeper for Sunderland.

References

1867 births
1897 deaths
Footballers from Newcastle upon Tyne
English footballers
Association football goalkeepers
Elswick Rangers F.C. players
Newcastle East End F.C. players
Sunderland A.F.C. players
Newcastle United F.C. players
South Shields F.C. (1889) players
English Football League players